Major Ronald Ivor Ferguson (10 October 1931 – 16 March 2003) was a polo manager, initially to the Duke of Edinburgh and later, for many years, to then Charles, Prince of Wales. His daughter, Sarah, Duchess of York, is the former wife of the Duke of York. He was the maternal grandfather of princesses Beatrice and Eugenie.

Biography

Early life
Ferguson was the son of Colonel Andrew Henry Ferguson (1899–1966) and his wife Marian Montagu Douglas Scott (1908–1996), a first cousin of Lady Alice Montagu Douglas Scott, who became (after her wedding to Prince Henry, Duke of Gloucester) Princess Alice, Duchess of Gloucester and an aunt-by-marriage of Queen Elizabeth II. His maternal grandfather was Lieutenant-Colonel Lord Herbert Montagu Douglas Scott, son of William Montagu Douglas Scott, 6th Duke of Buccleuch, a direct descendant of Charles II of England, and Lady Louisa Jane Hamilton.  His great-grandfather (through his paternal grandmother) was Henry Brand, 2nd Viscount Hampden. Ferguson's elder brother, John Ferguson, died at 10 years of age from peritonitis.

He was born in London and grew up at Dummer Down Farm, his later home in adulthood, at Dummer, near Basingstoke in Hampshire. He attended Ludgrove School followed by Eton College and Sandhurst.

Career
He entered the Life Guards in February 1952, the regiment of which his father had previously been Colonel. In 1954 Ferguson was promoted to Lieutenant and Captain in 1958. Ferguson retired in 1968 and was "granted the honorary rank of Major". During his career he served with the regiment in Germany, Egypt, Aden, and Cyprus. In 1987, he was entered as an officer (brother) in the Venerable Order of Saint John.

Polo
After he retired, he devoted himself to polo. His interest in polo frequently brought him into contact with the Royal Family, and it was through this connection that his daughter, Sarah, met Prince Andrew.

In 1979, on the England II team alongside Alan Kent, Patrick Churchward and Charles, Prince of Wales, he won the Silver Jubilee Cup.

In 1988, while his daughter Sarah was married to Prince Andrew, the News of the World printed a story about Ferguson's membership of the Wigmore Club, "a health club and massage parlour in London staffed by girls who, dressed in starched white 'medical' gowns, allegedly offered à la carte sexual services to members." He maintained that he had used the club "for massage only... and by that I mean a totally straight one" and as "a kind of cocoon where I could shut myself away for an hour and think". The controversy did not affect his marriage; however, it allegedly led him to leave his post as the Prince of Wales' polo manager and his position at the Guards Polo Club.

He was reinstated with the Guards Polo Club shortly before he died.

Personal life
Ferguson's first wife was Susan Wright. They married in St Margaret's, Westminster on 17 January 1956. They had two daughters:
 Jane Louisa Ferguson (b. 26 August 1957) married William Makim in July 1976 and they were divorced in 1991. She remarried  Rainer Hans Luedecke on January 1 1994. They have one daughter. 
 Seamus Makim (b. 1981)
 Ayesha Makim (b. 1986) married Sacha Specker in May 2015. They have one daughter:
 Polly Specker (b. February 19 2020)
 Heidi Olivia Luedecke (b. June 24 1996)
 Sarah Margaret Ferguson (b. 15 October 1959), later the Duchess of York; married Prince Andrew, Duke of York in 1986, by him being mother of Princesses Beatrice and Eugenie.

The couple divorced in 1974. During their marriage, the Fergusons were recognised society figures. The Major retired from his army career, and his family moved to Dummer Down Farm which he inherited upon his father's death.

In 1976, Ferguson married for the second time to Susan Rosemary Deptford (b. 1946). They had three children:
 Andrew Frederick John Ferguson (b. 1978); married Florence Jane C. Hill on June 15, 2019
 Alice Victoria Ferguson (b. 1980) married Nicholas Stileman on August 28, 2010. They have one daughter:
 Amara Eliza Stileman (b. April 10 2012)
 Elizabeth Charlotte "Eliza" Ferguson (b. 1985); married Harry Cobb on September 2 2017.

Ferguson's widow Susan remarried in Dummer in 2012, Lt-Gen Sir Richard Swinburn, who was made Commander UK Field Army in 1994. Prince Andrew, Sarah, Duchess of York and their two daughters attended Sir Richard and Lady Swinburn's wedding celebrations. Sir Richard died in October 2017.

His rare media appearances were to defend his daughter Sarah and raise awareness of prostate cancer. He had cancer during the last decade of his life. He was diagnosed with prostate cancer in 1996, and also had skin cancer. He suffered a heart attack in November 2002. In March 2003, he died, aged 71, of a heart attack at the Hampshire Clinic, Basingstoke, Hampshire, England.

Bibliography
The Galloping Major: My Life in Singular Times (London: Macmillan, 1994. )

References

1931 births
2003 deaths
British Life Guards officers
Clan Scott
English autobiographers
English polo players
People educated at Eton College
People from Dummer, Hampshire
Writers from London
Officers of the Order of St John
People associated with the Royal Military Academy Sandhurst
People educated at Ludgrove School